Local elections were held in Denmark on 7 March 1978.  4759 municipal council members were elected to the 1 April 1978 – 31 December 1981 term of office in the 275 municipalities, as well as members of the 14 counties of Denmark. The municipal and county councils began their term of office 1 April 1978 and it ended 31 December 1981. This was the last election that followed the old financial year 1 April – 31 March in the public sector. From 1 January 1979 the financial year in the public sector followed the calendar year 1 January – 31 December.

Results of regional elections
The results of the regional elections:

County Councils

Municipal Councils

References

1978
1978 elections in Denmark
March 1978 events in Europe